The 2018 Mzansi Super League was the inaugural edition of the Mzansi Super League (MSL) Twenty20 (T20) franchise cricket tournament in South Africa. It started on 16 November and finished on 16 December 2018. Six teams played a total of thirty-two matches. The players' draft took place on 17 October 2018, with more than 200 international players expressing their interest to take part.

On 18 October 2018, it was announced that Global Sports Commerce (GSC) is the official international commercial and broadcast partner from 2018 up to 2022. On 30 October 2018 it was announced that the Mzansi Super League 2018 champions will receive prize money of ZAR7 million and the runners up will receive R2.5 million, the player of the tournament received R100 000, and each player of the match won R15 000.

On 16 December 2018 the Jozi Stars won the first season final.

Squads
The following players were selected in the player draft on 17 October 2018:

Before the start of the tournament, JP Duminy was ruled out due to injury and was replaced by Quinton de Kock as the marquee player for Cape Town Blitz.

Points table

  The team topping the table after the league phase progressed to the final.
  The second and third teams played against each other in the Play-off match.
 The winning team gets a bonus point for a run rate better than 1.25 times that of the losing side.

League stage
The MSL released the full fixture list on 18 October 2018. The team that tops the table gets direct passage to the final and will also have home ground advantage.

Playoffs

Eliminator

Final

Statistics

Most runs

Most wickets

References

External links

Mzansi Super League
Mzansi Super League